The 2018 Women's Baseball World Cup was the 8th edition of the WBSC Women's Baseball World Cup, the biennial international women's baseball world championship tournament. The competition was held in Viera, Florida in the United States from August 22 to August 31, 2018.  The 2018 tournament was the first time that the United States hosted the event.

Qualification

In September 2017, the Baseball Federation of Asia held the first Women’s Baseball Asian Cup, a biennial tournament to be held in odd years and serve as a qualifying tournament for the Women’s Baseball World Cup.  Six teams competed in the 2017 tournament, from Chinese Taipei, Hong Kong, India, Japan, Pakistan, and South Korea.  Japan won all five of their games to win the tournament and qualify for the World Cup.  Chinese Taipei (2nd place), South Korea (3rd place), and Hong Kong (4th place) also qualified.

Teams 

For 2016, the number of qualifying teams grew from eight for its 6th edition in 2014 to twelve teams.

The following 12 teams qualified for the tournament.

Round 1

Group A

TPE wins tiebreak over USA (H2H)
VEN wins tiebreak over PUR (H2H)
QUAL = Qualified for the Super Round

Group B

DOM wins tiebreak over AUS (H2H)
QUAL = Qualified for the Super Round

Schedule Round 1 

*Completion of 8/22/18 suspended game
**Reschedule of 8/24/18 cancelled game

Standings Round 2

Each team comes into Round 2 carrying the record earned in Round 1 against teams that qualified for Round 2
USA wins tiebreak over CAN (H2H)

Schedule Round 2

Super Round

Round 3

Bronze Medal

Gold Medal

Final standings

References

External links
 Official site

Women's Baseball World Cup
2010s in women's baseball
2018 in baseball
Women's Baseball
Women's Baseball World Cup
Baseball competitions in Florida
Sports in Brevard County, Florida
International baseball competitions hosted by the United States
International sports competitions in Florida
Women's Baseball World Cup
Women's sports in Florida